U.S. Route 311 is a United States highway that runs for  from Winston-Salem, North Carolina to near Danville, Virginia. It connects the cities of Winston-Salem, Madison, and Eden.  The route runs northeast from Winston-Salem to Danville.  By the numbering convention, it is an auxiliary route of US 11, however except for a brief period shortly after the route was established, it has not connected to its parent route.

US 311 begins in Winston-Salem, at US 52 (exit 110B) in the downtown area, and proceeds northeast of the city.  Starting in the vicinity of Madison, US 311 follows a number of different North Carolina state highways in short succession along with another major US Highway, US 220 before crossing the Virginia line.  In Virginia, the route terminates shortly after crossing the border at the western end of the Danville Expressway (US 58).

In May 2018, North Carolina applied for, and received, permission from AASHTO to remove US 311 from the southernmost  of the route, being mostly redundant to I-74, bringing it to its current routing from Winston-Salem to Danville.

Route description

US 311 begins at exit 110B from the US 52/NC 8 freeway in Winston-Salem, NC and leads into the downtown area. It follows N Martin Luther King Jr Dr for a short time before continuing northeast along New Walkertown Road. It travels northeast and intersects NC 66 at the edge of Walkertown, which motorists can use to connect to nearby shopping centers situated along US 158 (Reidsville Road). Shortly after, US 311 then turns to follow Harley Drive and turns again to follow Main Street through town.  North of Walkertown, the road takes the local name of Walnut Cove Road.  At the southern edge of the town of Walnut Cove NC 65 joins for a short  concurrency.  At the northern boundary of Walnut Cove, NC 89 has its terminus at US 311, and the highway turns northeast.  North Carolina Highway 772 terminates at US 311 near Pine Hall and entering the town of Madison, US 311 takes an easterly route as Academy Street, meeting up with NC 704 along the way.  East of Madison, it leaves NC 704 and joins with the Future Interstate 73/US 220 by-pass, both routes traveling due north in a short concurrency to Mayodan. In Mayodan, US 311 then leaves the US 220 freeway, and proceeds easterly again, along NC 135 towards Eden.  Three other NC routes join with 311 in Eden in short succession: NC 770, NC 87 and NC 14, then the 4 joined routes cross the Dan River along Van Buren Street in Eden.  NC 14/NC 87 continue north on Van Buren, while US 311 exits Van Buren Street on a grade-separated interchange onto Meadow Road near the Eden Mall, heading northeast into a rural area before crossing into Virginia.

After the passing through the small communities of Berry Hill and Buford, it turns due west joining US 58 Business before the northern terminus of US 311 occurs at US 58, west of Danville at the western end of the Danville Expressway.

The J.J. Webster Highway is the official North Carolina name of US 311/NC 135 from Mayodan to Eden.

History

Established as an original U.S. Route in 1927, it originally traversed from West End, through Asheboro, High Point, Winston-Salem, Madison, and Stoneville, before entering Virginia and continuing to Roanoke, where it reached its parent route, U.S. 11.  The alignment followed part of what was NC 70 and all of NC 77, both of which were decommissioned in 1934.

In 1933, US 311 was extended south through Pinehurst, Aberdeen, and Laurinburg, to Rowland, overlapping NC 241.  A year later, US 220 was established and replaced US 311 south of Asheboro and north of Madison, severing the connection with its parent route. Sections further south were replaced by NC 2 (today's NC 211) and US 501.  Later in 1966, US 311 was truncated in Randleman; by 1973, US 311 southern terminus was moved to US 220 Bypass, in Randleman.

By 1952, US 311 was rerouted west of downtown Winston-Salem, following Waughtown Road, Stadium Drive, Claremont Avenue and 7th Street, to New Walkertown Road.  In the mid-1980s, US 311 was moved onto new freeway through southeast Forsyth County. Part of the freeway shortly became a stretch of Interstate 40, eventually running concurrent with the interstate . In 1996, the route through Winston-Salem changed again, this time also going north along US 52/NC 8 to Martin Luther King Jr. Drive then east onto New Walkertown Road.

In 1997, the first section of the East Belt was opened in High Point, rerouting US 311 onto the new freeway to Eastchester Drive then back into downtown High Point with concurrency with North Carolina Highway 68.  The old alignment along North Main Street became US 311 Business.  On November 20, 2004, the second section of the "East Belt" was opened, rerouting US 311 to I-85 Bus./US 29/US 70. On November 22, 2010, the third and final section of the "East Belt" was completed, linking Interstate 85; Also Interstate 74 was established as an concurrency of US 311 from Cedar Square Road to North Main Street.

In September 2003, US 311 was extended north from Madison to NC 14/NC 87/NC 770 in Eden, via US 220 and NC 135.  The extension was finally signed in August 2011. The route was approved by American Association of State Highway and Transportation Officials (AASHTO) in November 2012, after an initial request by officials in Eden, to be extended to US 58 in Virginia; which in January 2013, NCDOT signed off on extending the route and replacing parts of NC 700 and NC 770.  US 311 was signed in the field in Virginia, from Danville south to the state line (replacing secondary State Route 863) in September 2013.

Since 2003, a project called the "US 311 Connector" has been planned by NCDOT and the city of Winston-Salem.  Estimated at $23.5 million (2003 dollars), the  four-lane urban boulevard would connect between I-40 (exit 196) and I-40 Business (exit 8) (now US 421, exit 230), linking US 311 with US 158 (Reidsville Road); it also included a landscaped medium with walking/bicycle trails parallel to it. By 2016, the project has ceased appearing in the State Transportation Improvement Program (STIP), though still part of the Winston-Salem 2035 Transportation Plan.

In May 2018, AASHTO approved a request by NCDOT to eliminate  between Randleman and Winston-Salem, moving the southern terminus from I-73 in Randleman to Martin Luther King, Jr. Boulevard in Winston-Salem, as all but  of this section is freeway which already has other primary designations; those non-redundant sections would be reassigned secondary North Carolina routes. In January 2019, NCDOT officially eliminated the section.

North Carolina Highway 897

North Carolina Highway 897 (NC 897) was an original state highway that traversed from NC 60/NC 65, in Winston-Salem, to SR 33 at the Virginia state line.  Going north on Liberty Street, from 4th Street, in Winston-Salem, it went at a northeasterly route along Old Walkertown Road and Pine Hall Road to Pine Hall.  Continuing northeasterly, it connects Madison, Mayodan, Stoneville and Price, North Carolina before reaching the Virginia state line.  In 1925, it was renumbered as part of NC 77.  Today, all of the Forsyth and Stokes section of NC 897 have been downgraded to secondary roads; while the Pine Hall to Madison section is part of US 311 and the Madison to Stoneville is part of US 220 Business.

Junction list

Special routes

High Point business loop

In December 2005, US 311 Business was extended south, through the downtown area, to I-85 Bus./US 29/US 70. However, on November 23, 2009, US 311 Business was decommissioned, a couple of years before the completion of the "East Belt."

References

External links

 
 Endpoints of U.S. Highway 311

11-3
11-3
11-3
Transportation in Winston-Salem, North Carolina
Transportation in Randolph County, North Carolina
Transportation in Guilford County, North Carolina
Transportation in Forsyth County, North Carolina
Transportation in Stokes County, North Carolina
Transportation in Rockingham County, North Carolina
U.S. Route 311
3